A referendum on creating a state monopoly on alcoholic beverages was held in the Faroe Islands on 8 November 1973. The proposal was rejected by 62% of voters, equating to 37.7% of registered voters, above the 33% quorum required for rejection. Prohibition was eventually lifted in 1992.

Background
In 1907 the Løgting voted to hold a consultative referendum on banning alcoholic drinks. The result was a strong "yes" vote, with over 95% of voters voting for prohibition. As a result, a ban on the serving and trade in beverages with an alcoholic content above 2% was introduced the following year.

Results

References

1973 referendums
1973 in the Faroe Islands
1973
Prohibition referendums
November 1973 events in Europe